Pirenga is a rural locality (a Posyolok) in Polyarnye Zori municipality of Murmansk Oblast, Russia. The village is located beyond the Arctic circle, on the Kola Peninsula. It  is 137 m above sea level.

References

Rural localities in Murmansk Oblast